This article lists political parties in Afghanistan.

The Islamic Republic of Afghanistan had a multi-party system in development with numerous political parties, in which no one party often has a chance of gaining power alone, and parties must work with each other to form coalition governments.  No political party is permitted to exist that advocates anything that is deemed to go against Islamic morality.

The law governing the formation of political parties was promulgated in 2009, and requires parties to have at least 10,000 members, (previously they had only needed 700 members). The Afghan Ministry of Justice has registered 84 parties since the new law took effect.

After the Fall of Kabul on August 15, 2021, the Taliban is now in de facto control of Afghanistan. The Islamic Emirate of Afghanistan has been reestablished and many of the political parties are now banned or exiled. In September 2022, Acting Deputy Minister of Justice Maulvi Abdul Karim stated that there is "no need" for political parties to be active.

Major parties
Note that the following parties were major in the Islamic Republic of Afghanistan, now that the Islamic Emirate of Afghanistan has been reestablished the parties have been banned or sent to exile.

Minor parties

Welfare Party of Afghanistan (Hizb-e-Refah e Afghanistan)
National Movement (Basej-e Milli)
Democratic Party of Afghanistan
Afghanistan Coherence and Mutation Party (Majma e Haqiqat e Afghan)
National Congress Party (Hezb-e-Congra-e-Mili Afghanistan)
National Islamic Front (Hezb-e-Mahaz-e-Mili Islami)
National Movement of Afghanistan (Hezb-e-Nuhzhat-e-Mili Afghanistan)
National Solidarity Movement (Hezb-e-Nahzat-e-Hambastagee Mili)
National Sovereignty Party (Hezb-e-Eqtedar-e-Mili)
National Islamic Unity Party (Hezb-e-Wahdat-e-Mili Islami)
National Solidarity Party (Hezb-e-Paiwand Mili)
New Afghanistan Party (Hezb-e Afghanistan Naween)
Pashtoons Social Democratic Party (De Pashtano Tolaneez Wolaswaleez Gwand)
People's Islamist Movement (Harakat-e Islami-yi)
People's Party of Afghanistan (Hizb-e Mardum-e Afghanistan)
Progressive Democratic Party of Afghanistan
Truth and Justice (Hezb-e-Haq-wa-Edalat)
Unit Party
Youth Solidarity Party of Afghanistan (Hezb-e-Hambastagee Mili Jawanan) led by Doctor Fahim Tokhi
Afghan Liberal Party (Hizbe Azadikhwai Afghanistan)
Watan Party of Afghanistan
Hezbollah Afghanistan

Former parties

Since the coup in 1973, Afghanistan has had many different political parties. These include Mohammed Daoud Khan's National Revolutionary Party of Afghanistan, the People's Democratic Party and the Democratic Watan Party of Afghanistan from the communist era, and the Northern Alliance that took power after the Fall of Kabul in April 1992, and ran the country until the Taliban's coup in 1996.

References

External links
 د افغانستان متحد ملت ګوند Afghanistan United Nation Party Website
 Licensed political parties (from the Afghanistan Ministry of Justice)
 Leftist parties of Afghanistan
 Crisis Group Asia Briefing N°39, Political Parties in Afghanistan, 5 June 2005
 Afghanistan Analysts Network series on Afghan political parties (begun in 2012)
 Political Parties in Afghanistan United States Institute of Peace

See also
 List of political parties by country

Afghanistan
 
Political parties
Political parties
Afghanistan